The Plough flag is a red banner with a white or yellow plough positioned in the center of it, widely used in the period of the Northern Expedition as the flag of the Chinese Peasants' Association.

Symbolism 

The plough symbolizes the peasants' leadership in rural areas, and the red color stands for the victory of the communist revolution.
When it is depicted in works of art, it is generally shown in conjunction with Mao Zedong and/or armed peasants. An example of this can be found in an illustrated pamphlet titled "'This is fine' – In memory of the 44th anniversary of the publication of 'Report on an Investigation of the Peasant Movement in Hunan"', published by the People's Press of Guangdong, where the illustrator uses the plough flag as a symbol of the peasant movement.

History 
It is believed that Peng Pai was the first to use this flag in 1923, as the Chairman of the Peasants' Association of Hailufeng.
During the period of first United Front, when the peasant movement in China was at its peak, the plough appeared in the flag and membership cards of the local peasant associations in several provinces. Another version of the flag, used by the left-wing of the Kuomintang, combines the plough with the Flag of the Republic of China.

After July 15, 1927, when the Communist Party was made illegal in Wuhan, the associations controlled by the communists stopped using the "Kuomintang" version of the flag and instead began using a version with a completely red background.

After the establishment of the People's Republic of China, plough flags have been placed in several museums around the country (e.g. the museum of Guangxi) as well as being featured in paintings as the symbol of the peasant movement during the Encirclement Campaigns. A Caicha Opera titled "Ode to the Plough Flag" was composed in Yangxin, Hubei.

Compared to Starry Plough Flag 
The Starry Plough Flag is a similar banner used by the Irish Citizen Army, but with imagery of the Ursa Major constellation. However, there is no evidence that Peng Pai borrowed from the Irish design.

Gallery

See also 

Starry Plough (flag)
Communist symbolism
Peng Pai
Mao Zedong
Communist Party of China
Chinese civil war
Chinese Peasants‘ Association
Chinese Red Army

References

External links

Military history of China
History of the Chinese Communist Party
Ploughs